St Winefride Church may refer to:
 St Winefride's Church, Holywell, Flintshire
 St Winefride's Church, Sandbach, Cheshire
 St Winefride Church, South Wimbledon, London
 Our Lady of Loreto and St Winefride's Church, Kew, London
 Our Lady Star of the Sea and St Winefride Church, Amlwch

See also
 Saint Winifred
 St Winefride's Well